Paul Anthony Hegarty (born 25 July 1954 in Edinburgh) is a Scottish football player and manager. He was captain of Dundee United during their most successful era in the 1970s and 1980s, winning the Scottish league championship in 1983 and the Scottish League Cup twice. Hegarty won eight full international caps for Scotland. He has managed Forfar Athletic, Aberdeen, Dundee United, Livingston and Montrose.

Playing career

Hamilton Academical
Hegarty's senior career began as a striker with Hamilton Accies in 1972.

Dundee United
In November 1974, Dundee United manager Jim McLean signed him for a fee of £27,500. Two years later, McLean transformed Hegarty's career when he experimented by pairing him with Dave Narey in United's central defence. The partnership they forged would be integral to United's successes for over a decade and Hegarty would develop into a top class central defender. As club captain, Hegarty led United to their first ever major trophy, the Scottish League Cup in 1979, which they retained the following year.

In 1982–83, Hegarty was an ever-present as United captured the Scottish League title. Hegarty temporarily played as a goalkeeper during a match against Morton that season, after Hamish McAlpine was injured. He also featured in many notable victories in European competition, albeit injury restricted his participation in United's run to the 1987 UEFA Cup Final.

In recognition of his contribution to Dundee United, the club allowed him to leave on a free transfer in January 1990.

St Johnstone
He briefly played for St. Johnstone, helping them to promotion.

Scotland 
Hegarty represented his country between 1979 and 1983, captaining the side against Northern Ireland in his eighth and final appearance for Scotland. He is widely regarded as one of the best central halves to have never been a regular for Scotland. He also turned out for the under-21 side as a permitted over-age player and represented the Scottish League.

Coaching career
Hegarty's first coaching role was with Forfar Athletic as player/manager. The team were relegated in 1992 and Hegarty left shortly afterwards.

He then had coaching roles with Dundee United (leaving Tannadice in 1995), Hearts and Aberdeen. Following the dismissal of Alex Miller in January 1999, he was appointed Aberdeen manager on an interim basis. However, despite saving the club from relegation, Aberdeen elected at the end of the season not to continue with Hegarty in the job on a long-term basis.

Once again, Dundee United offered Hegarty a coaching role. This became a manager role in October 2002 after chairman Eddie Thompson was unable to prise first-choice Ian McCall from Falkirk. Initially appointed as caretaker, Hegarty's role was to be extended until the end of the season before he was sacked in January 2003 – and subsequently replaced with McCall.

Hegarty continued to work in coaching, having been on the staff of both Livingston and then Dunfermline. While at Dunfermline, Hegarty was approached by Inverness CT to be part of the management with former Dundee United colleague Maurice Malpas, although the move never materialised. He was eventually appointed as assistant to Malpas at Motherwell on 25 May 2006, although later replaced by Scott Leitch when Malpas was sacked in June 2007.

In March 2008, Hegarty became one of new Scotland manager George Burley's scouts for the World Cup qualifying group. In December 2008 he was appointed as the manager of Livingston after Roberto Landi was sacked. Livingston had severe financial problems, however, and Hegarty left the post a few months later. He left his position with the Scotland national team in November 2009.

Hegarty returned to Dundee United in February 2010. Following the resignation of manager Peter Houston in January 2013, Hegarty was named as the club's caretaker manager. While he was due to take charge of an SPL match against Motherwell, the match was postponed due to a waterlogged pitch, and Jackie McNamara was named as the club's manager before the next match came around. Hegarty left the club soon afterwards.

Hegarty returned to management in February 2015 when he was appointed manager of Montrose, then placed last in Scottish League Two. He couldn't prevent the side from finishing last at the end of the 2014–15 season which was the first season that a new play-off system with a non-Scottish Professional Football League from both the Highland Football League and Lowland Football League. The club won the first two-legged final against Brora Rangers of the Highland Football League to avoid relegation. Soon after, Hegarty was appointed permanent manager on a two-year contract at Links Park alongside assistant and former United teammate John Holt. Hegarty was sacked by Montrose in November 2016, after a run of bad results left the club in ninth position in the league.

Personal life
Hegarty's elder brother Kevin played for Dunfermline Athletic as did his nephew (Kevin's son), Ryan.

Career statistics

Honours

Player 
Dundee United
Scottish Premier Division: 1982–83
Scottish League Cup: 1978–79, 1979–80
Runner-up 1980–81, 1984–85
UEFA Cup: Runner-up 1986–87
Scottish Cup: Runner-up 1980–81, 1984–85, 1986–87, 1987–88

St Johnstone
Scottish First Division (second tier): 1989–90

Individual
PFA Scotland Players' Player of the Year: 1979

Managerial statistics

no statistics currently available for Forfar Athletic.

See also
 List of footballers in Scotland by number of league appearances (500+)
 List of Scottish football families 
 List of Scotland national football team captains

References

External links
 Official Dundee United Legends Profile
 

1954 births
Living people
Footballers from Edinburgh
Scottish footballers
Scottish football managers
Association football central defenders
Hamilton Academical F.C. players
Dundee United F.C. players
St Johnstone F.C. players
Forfar Athletic F.C. players
Scottish Football League players
Forfar Athletic F.C. managers
Aberdeen F.C. managers
Dundee United F.C. managers
Livingston F.C. managers
Motherwell F.C. non-playing staff
Scotland international footballers
Scotland under-21 international footballers
Tynecastle F.C. players
Scottish Premier League managers
Livingston F.C. non-playing staff
Dunfermline Athletic F.C. non-playing staff
Scottish Football League representative players
Scottish Football League managers
Montrose F.C. managers
Scottish Professional Football League managers
Outfield association footballers who played in goal